Makan Traoré (born 26 May 1992) is a French professional footballer who plays as a defender for Fleury.

Career
Born in Ivry-sur-Seine, Traoré trained at Châteauroux from the age at 14, playing at U17 and U19 levels for the club. In the summer of 2010 he joined Viry-Châtillon for a season before moving to Valenciennes, where he played only for the B team. In June 2012 he signed for Laval, on a three-year professional contract.

Traoré made his professional debut for Laval in the first Ligue 2 game of the 2012–13 season, playing 88 minutes of a 1–1 draw against his former club Châteauroux. Despite regular appearances in his first season at the club, he was given little playing time the following season, and on 10 June 2014 it was announced that he was leaving Laval.

In July 2014, Traoré signed a one-year professional contract with Paris Saint-Germain, to strengthen the club's B team. By 2017, Makan was third choice as in his left back position, and regularly trained with the professional group at the club, and subject of interest from clubs in England, Scotland and Belgium, but he was frustrated at the lack of opportunity to progress. He left the club without any deal, and signed short term for Régional 2 (level 7) side Thonon Evian in the autumn, before moving to the United States to play for FC Miami City in December 2017.

In December 2018 Traoré returned to France with Bastia-Borgo, signing initially until the end of the 2018–19 season. He went on to make 44 league appearances for the club before leaving at the end of the 2020–21 season.

In July 2021, Traoré signed for Championnat National 2 side Versailles. On 2 January 2022, he scored a "magnificent" volley goal in a Coupe de France match against La Roche.

In June 2022, Traoré signed with Fleury in Championnat National 2.

Honours 
Versailles

 Championnat National 2: 2021–22

References

1992 births
Living people
Association football defenders
French footballers
French sportspeople of Malian descent
People from Ivry-sur-Seine
Championnat National 2 players
Ligue 2 players
Championnat National 3 players
Championnat National players
LB Châteauroux players
ES Viry-Châtillon players
Valenciennes FC players
Stade Lavallois players
Paris Saint-Germain F.C. players
Thonon Evian Grand Genève F.C. players
FC Miami City players
FC Bastia-Borgo players
FC Versailles 78 players
FC Fleury 91 players
French expatriate footballers
Expatriate soccer players in the United States
French expatriate sportspeople in the United States
Black French sportspeople